Pseudogonia is a genus of flies in the family Tachinidae.

Species
P. fasciata (Wiedemann, 1819)
P. parisiaca (Robineau-Desvoidy, 1851)
P. rufifrons (Wiedemann, 1830)

References

Exoristinae
Diptera of Asia
Diptera of Europe
Tachinidae genera
Taxa named by Friedrich Moritz Brauer
Taxa named by Julius von Bergenstamm